Souk Sidi Mahrez  is one of the popular souks of the medina of Tunis. It is specialized in selling fabrics.

Etymology 
The souk got its name from the saint Sidi Mahrez Sultan of the medina whose real name is Cadhi Abou Mohamed Mahrez Ibn Khalaf.

Location 
It is located in Bab Souika suburb in the north of the medina, in Sidi Mahrez Street.

Monuments 
The souk has a zaouia (mausoleum) and a mosque, both with the name of the saint.

Sidi El Ghali Mosque is located near the entrance of the souk.

Notes and references 

Sidi Mahrez